"The Psychobombs" is the twelfth episode aired of the first series of UFO, a 1970 British television science fiction series about an alien invasion of Earth. The screenplay was written by Tony Barwick and the director was Jeremy Summers. The episode was filmed between 30 June and 10 July 1970, and first aired on ATV Midlands on 30 December 1970. Though shown as the twelfth episode, it was actually the twenty-second to be filmed.

The series was created by Gerry Anderson and Sylvia Anderson with Reg Hill, and produced by the Andersons and Lew Grade's Century 21 Productions for Grade's ITC Entertainment company.

Story
A UFO lands in England, and takes control of the minds of two men and a woman (Linda Simmons, Daniel Clark and Clem Mason). Each is given superhuman strength as well as being made into a walking bomb. Simmons strangles a policeman close to her home, and each of the three is sent to destroy a SHADO installation. Following an unsuccessful attack on Straker's car, a note is found detailing three attacks on SHADO if it continues to operate.

Clark attacks the Fairfield Tracker Station, which he destroys by grabbing high-voltage power cables and then exploding. This is followed by Mason evading security and getting on board Skydiver 3, and destroying it by grabbing power cables as it leaves its base of operations.

Foster investigates Simmonds (following up on the strangled policeman), the last surviving 'living bomb', and takes her to SHADO headquarters unaware of what she is capable of. Whilst in detention, Simmonds escapes and looks for high-voltage cables she can use to explode herself. Just before she manages to do this, Sky One destroys the UFO that has been controlling the humans, and Simmonds only electrocutes herself.

Cast

Starring
 Ed Bishop — Commander Edward Straker
 Michael Billington — Col. Paul Foster
 Vladek Sheybal — Dr. Douglas Jackson
 Wanda Ventham — Col. Virginia Lake
 Ayshea — Lt. Ayshea Johnson

Also starring
 Deborah Grant — Linda Simmonds	
 Mike Pratt — Clem Mason

Featuring
 David Collings — Daniel Clark	
 Tom Adams — Capt. Lauritzen	
 Alexander Davion — The executive	
 Robin Hawdon — Capt. Skydiver 3
 Christopher Timothy — Navigator Skydiver 3 
 Peter Dolphin — Engineer Skydiver 3 
 Mark York — Engineer Skydiver 3 
 Peter Blythe — Lt. Blythe	
 Oscar James — Police officer	
 Aiden Murphy — Guard	
 Peter Davies — Fairfield Tracker Station Guard	
 Derek Steen — Fairfield Tracker Station Guard

Production notes
Neither this episode nor "Confetti Check A-O.K." begin with the regular opening sequence of an eye guard being removed from an alien's eye.

Locations used for the filming included Heatherden Hall, Pinewood Studios and St Alphage House, London.

References

External links

1970 British television episodes
UFO (TV series) episodes